Villar de los Navarros is a municipality located in the province of Zaragoza, Aragon, Spain. According to the 2004 census (INE), the municipality has a population of 143 inhabitants.  The Battle of Villar de los Navarros took place here in 1837.

References

Municipalities in the Province of Zaragoza